Consolidated Building is a historic commercial building located at Columbia, South Carolina. It was built in 1912, and is a two-story building faced with elaborate colored and glazed terra cotta. The second floor features a central tripartite round-headed window.

It was added to the National Register of Historic Places in 1979.

References

External links

Historic American Buildings Survey in South Carolina
Commercial buildings on the National Register of Historic Places in South Carolina
Buildings and structures completed in 1912
Buildings and structures in Columbia, South Carolina
National Register of Historic Places in Columbia, South Carolina
1912 establishments in South Carolina